The National Congress for New Politics (NCNP) was a political party of South Korea.

History
The party was formed in 1995 as the National Congress for New Politics after Kim Dae-jung returned to active politics following his retirement in 1992. The majority of the party's early supporters were former members of the opposition Democratic Party, formed in 1991.

In the 1996 Parliamentary election the party managed to come a strong second, winning 79 seats. Later Kim's Democratic Party merged to the party. In the 1997 Presidential election, the party formed Alliance of DJP along with Alliance of Liberal Democrats, and Kim won the Presidency with 40% of the vote.

Dozens of members of the party were killed in the crash of Korean Air Flight 801 in August 1997.

In 2000, the party merged with the smaller New People Party, led by Rhee In-je, and a number of conservative politicians to create the  Millennium Democratic Party.

Presidential election primary

Candidates
This is a  list of official pre-registered candidates that declared their 2007 presidential bid.

 Kim Yeong-hwan(김영환), former Assembly member and also former Minister of Science and Technology of the Kim Dae-jung Administration has been declared not to run its presidential primary on August 31, 2007

Election results

President

Legislature

Local

See also
List of political parties in South Korea
Politics of South Korea
Elections in South Korea
Liberalism in South Korea

Notes

References

Democratic parties in South Korea
Defunct political parties in South Korea
Conservative liberal parties
Neoliberalism
Political parties established in 1995
Political parties disestablished in 2000